The Zoological Association of America (ZAA) is a non-profit organization founded in 2005 dedicated to responsible wildlife management, conservation, and education. The ZAA is headquartered in Punta Gorda, Florida, and accredits zoos and aquariums within the United States.

History 
In 1987, former Sedgewick County Zoo director Ron Blakely invited experts on animal care and zookeeping from public and private institutions to form an organization in opposition to the Association of Zoos and Aquariums (AZA), which resulted in the formation of the International Society of Zooculturists (ISZ).

In February 2005, the ISZ and sister organization United Zoological Association (UZA) merged to form the ZAA. Former Lowry Park Zoo CEO Lex Salisbury would host the ZAA in 2007, and use the zoo's facilities to run the organization in 2008.

Accreditation and activities 
The ZAA operates on a membership, which must be applied for before the accreditation process. In order to apply for accreditation, a zoo or aquarium must engage in the care and exhibition of animals with a focus on conservation, as well as performing educational outreach and breeding programs. As of 2020, the ZAA recognizes 61 accredited zoos and aquariums.

The ZAA also holds a yearly Awards Ceremony, honoring ZAA Accredited zoos, honoring and celebrating exhibit design, education, breeding, as well as dedication towards the conservation of a specific species or specific animal.

Controversy 
The ZAA has received controversy due to its more relaxed approach to its more flexible requirements for animal care, and supposed ease of accreditation compared to the AZA. The Humane Society of the United States president Wayne Pacelle has claimed that the ZAA serves to weaken laws and regulations meant to protect exotic animals in captivity, and serves to obfuscate the more rigorous and strict accreditation requirements of the AZA for the public. The ZAA has opposed passing a US Fish and Wildlife regulation to help prevent captive tigers in the US for being sold for black market parts. The organization has also received criticism due to their approval of breeding of white tigers, a practice that is condemned in AZA accredited zoos due to the risk of disease, as well as other congenital effects due to inbreeding.

The ZAA's policies on elephant care have also sparked controversy, as the ZAA's elephant care practices allow for free contact. This is opposed to the AZA's standard of protected contact in which a sturdy barrier for protection must be between handlers and elephants at all times for each party's safety.

According to Big Cat Rescue, "The Zoological Association of America (ZAA) claims to have been founded in 2005, but appears to have just been an idea that never really took off until the Lowry Park Zoo, under leadership of Lex Salisbury, lost its AZA accreditation in 2008."

See also
 List of zoo associations

References

External links 
 ZAA Website

Zoology organizations based in the United States
Non-profit organizations based in Florida
Punta Gorda, Florida
Organizations established in 1987